Mihkel Krents (29 May 1881 Pärsamaa Parish (now Saaremaa Parish), Kreis Ösel – 8 May 1935 Järve Parish, Virumaa) was an Estonian politician. He was a member of III Riigikogu, representing the Estonian Workers' Party. He was a member of the Riigikogu since 4 December 1928. He replaced Arnold Grimpel.

References

1881 births
1935 deaths
People from Saaremaa Parish
People from Kreis Ösel
Estonian Workers' Party politicians
Members of the Riigikogu, 1926–1929